KLVS (107.3 FM) is a radio station broadcasting a Christian Contemporary format from K-Love, licensed to Livermore, California, United States. The station is owned by San Joaquin Broadcasting Company, a subsidiary of the Educational Media Foundation.

History
107.3 FM signed on the air in 1962 as KSTN-FM, carrying a full-time classical music format. The following year, it added some Regional Mexican Music and by 1965, they dropped classical music entirely and expanded the Spanish programming with some simulcast of the Top 40 music of its AM sister station at 1420. KSTN-FM transmitted monaural audio from its inception in 1962 until 1996 when it switched to stereo.

On February 22, 2010, KSTN-FM dropped its Regional Mexican format in favor of an English-language Contemporary Christian music format, via satellite from K-LOVE. The station changed its calls to KLVS in March 2010.

References

External links

K-Love radio stations
Radio stations established in 1962
1962 establishments in California
LVS